State Route 237 (SR 237) is a state highway in the U.S. state of California that runs from El Camino Real (SR 82) in Mountain View to Interstate 680 in Milpitas. Known as the Southbay Freeway for most of its length, SR 237 runs south of the San Francisco Bay, connecting the East Bay to the Peninsula.

Route description

Route 237 begins at a junction of Grant Road with El Camino Real (SR 82) in Mountain View, as a four lane divided highway. Most traffic comes from California State Route 85. Westbound traffic can connect to Route 85 southbound, but the eastbound traffic connection to Route 85 northbound is labeled as an exit for U.S. 101. Route 237 intersects with Highway 101 at the southern corner of Moffett Field. After this intersection, a carpool lane is added, for a total of three lanes in either direction. It remains like this until the east end of the freeway at Interstate 880, where most eastbound traffic is directed to northbound I-880. The route then becomes a city street (an arterial road), Calaveras Boulevard, in Milpitas, terminating at Interstate 680.

Exit signs from U.S. 101 north to Route 237 west currently say "Mountain View-Alviso Road". Starting from half a mile after the highway's western terminus, and ending at the I-880 intersection, Route 237 is mostly constructed to Interstate standards, and is named the Southbay Freeway. It is not part of the Interstate system, however.

Route 237 is known for a number of companies that define Silicon Valley's technological landscape. Many major software and hardware manufacturers have their headquarters along 237. Some of these manufacturers include Lockheed-Martin, Brocade Communications Systems, Nortel Networks, Cisco Systems, Yahoo!, Juniper Networks, TiVo, Ariba and NetApp.

SR 237 is part of the California Freeway and Expressway System, and is part of the National Highway System, a network of highways that are considered essential to the country's economy, defense, and mobility by the Federal Highway Administration.

Highway 237 Bikeway
The Highway 237 Bikeway is a  pedestrian and bicycle path that parallels State Route 237.  The majority of the path is separated from vehicular traffic, however, two sections comprising a total of  follow an on-street alignment adjacent the freeway.

This bikeway serves as an important connector in the network of trails in San Jose and Santa Clara County.  It intersects with the Guadalupe River Trail, which provides access to Downtown San Jose, as well as the San Tomas Aquino Creek and Coyote Creek trails.

Express lanes
Instead of terminating exactly at the I-880 interchange, the Express Lanes continue along an connector ramp to I-880, so that eastbound Express Lane users merge directly into the I-880 northbound HOV lane (which itself becomes an Express Lane), and I-880 southbound Express Lane users can directly enter Route 237's westbound Express Lane.

, the HOT lanes' hours of operation is weekdays between 5:00 am and 8:00 pm. Solo drivers are tolled using a congestion pricing system based on the real-time levels of traffic. Two-person carpools and clean air vehicles with a solo driver are charged 50 percent of the posted toll. Carpools with 3 or more people and motorcycles are not charged. All tolls are collected using an open road tolling system, and therefore there are no toll booths to receive cash. Each vehicle is required to carry either a FasTrak Flex or CAV (Clean Air Vehicle) transponder, with its switch set to indicate the number of the vehicle's occupants (1, 2, or 3 or more). Solo drivers may also use the FasTrak standard tag without the switch. Drivers without any FasTrak tag will be assessed a toll violation regardless of whether they qualified for free.

History
Before Route 237 was upgraded to freeway status in 1994–1995, it was a four-lane expressway with at-grade intersections, known as Alviso-Milpitas Road or Milpitas-Alviso Road depending on different maps showing the description.

The Route 237 corridor has long been sought as a location for a freeway connector between Interstates 680 and 880. Many possible sites have been suggested, from Montague Expressway in North San Jose to Mission Boulevard in Fremont. One map printed before Route 237's construction to freeway standards between Alviso and 880 showed a new freeway across bay wetlands between Alviso and the Scott Creek Road interchange in South Fremont. Grading and underpasses for a freeway interchange are presently visible along 680 near Scott Creek Road.

Major intersections

See also

References

External links

Bay Area FasTrak – includes toll information on the SR 237 Express Lanes and the other Bay Area toll facilities
Caltrans: Route 237 highway conditions
California Highways: SR 237
Highway 237 / I-880 Interchange Reconstruction Project
California @ AARoads.com - State Route 237

237
237
State Route 237
Transportation in Sunnyvale, California